Kurdmax Pepûle is a Kurdish-language children television channel founded in 2014 in Iraqi Kurdistan. It is based in Erbil, Arbil Governorate, northern Iraq.

External links
  
 Kurdmax Pepule Kurdtvs Live stream

Children's television networks
Television stations in Kurdistan Region (Iraq)
Television stations in Iraq
Kurdish-language television stations
Mass media in Erbil
Satellite television
2014 establishments in Iraqi Kurdistan
Television channels and stations established in 2014